The Resurrection of Christ, The Easter Tomb or The Triumph of Christ over Death and Sin is a painting by Peter Paul Rubens, executed c. 1616. It entered the collection of Ferdinando de' Medici, Grand Prince of Tuscany between 1713 and 1723 and is now in the Galleria Palatina of the Palazzo Pitti in Florence.

Bibliography
Marco Chiarini, Galleria palatina e Appartamenti Reali, Sillabe, Livorno 1998.

External links
Catalogue entry

1616 paintings
Paintings by Peter Paul Rubens
Paintings in the collection of the Galleria Palatina
Rubens
Angels in art